Nozibele Nyalambisa is a South African politician serving as an African National Congress Member of the Eastern Cape Provincial Legislature since 2019.

Political career
Nyalambisa had served as an African National Congress representative to the Amathole District Municipality from the Mbhashe Local Municipality.

Nyalambisa was ranked 37th on the ANC's candidates list for the Eastern Cape Provincial Legislature election on 8 May 2019. She was elected as the ANC won 44 seats. She was sworn as a member of the Eastern Cape Provincial Legislature on 22 May. She currently sits on the Rural Development and Agrarian Reform Committee and the  Health Committee.

References

External links

Living people
1973 births
Xhosa people
People from the Eastern Cape
African National Congress politicians
Members of the Eastern Cape Provincial Legislature
Women members of provincial legislatures of South Africa